This is a list of active duty United States Army major generals collected from publicly available and accessible information.

Joint positions

Department of Defense

Office of the Secretary of Defense

Defense Agencies

Joint Staff

Unified Combatant Commands

National Guard

Other joint positions

United States Army

Department of the Army

Army Staff

Army commands

Army service component commands

Direct reporting units

Army-level positions

Corps-level positions

Division-level positions

Regular divisions

Division-sized units

Army National Guard

List of pending appointments

Awaiting reassignment

Retaining current position/position unannounced

These are general officers awaiting promotion to a higher rank while retaining their current position or do not have their future position announced yet.

See also
List of active duty United States four-star officers
List of active duty United States three-star officers
List of active duty United States Marine Corps major generals
List of active duty United States rear admirals
List of active duty United States Air Force major generals
List of active duty United States Space Force general officers
List of active duty United States senior enlisted leaders and advisors
List of current United States National Guard major generals
List of United States Army four-star generals
List of United States Marine Corps four-star generals
List of United States Navy four-star admirals
List of United States Air Force four-star generals
List of United States Space Force four-star generals
List of United States Coast Guard four-star admirals

References

Notes

 
Army major generals active duty
Major Generals
Two-star officers
United States Army major generals